Road signs in Finland are formerly regulated in Tieliikenneasetus (5.3.1982/182), but is currently regulated in Siirtymäsäännökset (8.5.2020/360).

Most signs are based on pictograms, except signs like the prohibition-sign for stop at customs and the sign indicating a taxi rank. If the sign includes text, the text is written in Finnish or Swedish, except the stop sign and taxi signs which are written in English (some taxi signs are written in Finnish). Many roads and places in Finland have Finnish and Swedish names, so both are marked on the traffic signs. This is common in the Swedish-speaking areas on the southern and western coasts, whereas in the inland Swedish names are far less common. In northern Lapland there are also traffic signs in the Sámi language.

At many unregulated intersections the practice is to yield to traffic on-coming from the right, unless there is a “yield” or “give way” sign posted for the right on-coming traffic. This can be a problem on some streets since these signs are not always visible to traffic that does not have to yield. Therefore, unless a driver is experienced with the area and its signs, they should take care to give way to the right at an intersection, even if the road he or she is on appears to be the priority road.

Finnish road signs depict gender-neutral people with stylized silhouettes since 2020; between 1982 and 2020, the designs were realistic, as was common in most Scandinavian countries at the time. Since the last legal reform, most of the pictograms and arrows are identical to their German counterparts, whereas the new diagrams for people are similar to the Danish models.

In addition, Åland, an autonomous region of Finland, has some in Swedish-style signs and all are written in the Swedish language.

Major differences between Finnish and general European signs
Whereas European signs usually have white background on warning and prohibition signs, Finnish signs have a yellow/orange colour. This is for the purpose of enhancing the visibility of the sign during the winter, as white signs would be hard to see in the snow. Prohibition signs displaying a symbol other than a numeric value have a diagonal red line across them. Prohibition signs in Iceland and Sweden are similar in this respect. In most European countries, however, such signs do not usually include a red line.

Warning signs
Warning signs are triangular, but in contrast to those of most other states using triangular warning signs, Finnish signs have yellow backgrounds, rather than white.

Priority signs

Prohibitory signs
Prohibitory signs are round with yellow backgrounds and red borders, except the no parking and no standing signs that have a blue background instead of yellow.

Mandatory signs
Mandatory signs are always round blue signs with white border.

Special regulation signs

Information signs

Service signs

Additional panels

Other signs

Retired signs (no longer used)
Below, signs are withdrawn or replaced with new diagrams of the same meaning.

Attention signs

Warning signs

Priority signs

Prohibitory signs

Mandatory signs

Special regulation signs

Information signs

Service signs

References
https://www.finlex.fi/fi/laki/ajantasa/2018/20180729#L7P195

Finland
Road transport in Finland